The Roman Catholic Diocese of Moosonee was a Roman Catholic diocese that included part of the Province of Ontario.

As of 2016, the diocese contained 12 parishes with no active diocesan priests, 3 religious priests, and 7,450 Catholics. It also had 3 religious brothers.

On 3 December 2018, this Diocese merged with the Diocese of Hearst, to create the new Diocese of Hearst–Moosonee.

History 
 3 December 1938: Established as the Apostolic Vicariate of Baie de James from the Diocese of Haileybury and Apostolic Vicariate of Northern Ontario.
 13 July 1967: Elevated as the Diocese of Moosonee.
 31 May 2007: Lost territory to the Roman Catholic Diocese of Amos.
 3 December 2018: Officially suppressed and its territory united into the Roman Catholic Diocese of Hearst to create the Roman Catholic Diocese of Hearst–Moosonee.

Diocesan bishops
The following is a list of the Vicars apostolic and bishops of Moosonee and their terms of service:
Henri Belleau, OMI (1939–1964)
Jules Leguerrier, OMI (1964–1992)
Vincent Cadieux, OMI (1991–2016)
From 2007 to 2016, he served as Bishop of Hearst as well, an appointment that joined the two dioceses only through him, in persona episcopi, but did not create a single diocesan administration.
Robert Bourgon (Apostolic Administrator 2016–2018)

References

External links
Diocese of Moosonee page at catholichierarchy.org retrieved 3 December 2018

Catholic Church in Ontario
Christian organizations established in 1938
Roman Catholic dioceses and prelatures established in the 20th century
Former Roman Catholic dioceses in America
Roman Catholic Ecclesiastical Province of Keewatin–Le Pas